Robert F. Cook (1880–1958) served as the prime missionary responsible for the establishment of the Pentecostal movement in India. Though a number of missionaries came before him and though the Pentecostal experience took place in India independent of foreign missionary work, Cook was the one that first established works that began to spread into neighboring areas. He came to India in October 1913. In 1914, he established a church in Thuvayoor, Kerala. However, three years later, on August 31, 1917, his wife, Anna, died. The following year, he met and married Bertha Frank.

Until 1921, he was stationed in Bangalore. In January, 1921, he headquartered his work in a rented home and began his work in Kerala. He started the first Pentecostal Bible School to train local men for the mission field at Kottarakkara in 1922 at his residence. He forged alliance with K.E. Abraham and together with him registered his churches under the name, Malankara Full Gospel Church of God. By 1922, he released the works in Bangalore to fellow workers.

The work of the Church of God was started in India by Robert F. Cook. Cook worked in India during the 1920s through the 1940s. After some attempts to begin a Pentecostal work in northern parts of India, Cook realized that there were ancient Christian communities in southern India, especially in Kerala. After arriving in Kerala, he fell in love with the land and the people. He crossed paths with a man named Kalloor Chacko, of Thrikkannamangal, Kottarakara. While a prominent figure in the Brethren Church in India, Chacko accepted the teachings of Cook regarding the work of the Holy Spirit. The two joined hands to establish the first registered Pentecostal church in India. It was named the Church of God. Cook, meanwhile, joined the Church of God (Cleveland, Tennessee). The two built the first church building on land set aside by Chacko.

A number of early leaders, including Rev. K. E. Abraham, worked hand in hand with Cook to establish numerous works in various parts of Kerala. As time went by, disagreements over doctrine and organizational structure led to many of these early leaders parting ways. Disagreement with Chacko also resulted in Cook relocating the headquarters to Mulakuzha. The founder of the Ceylon Pentecostal Mission Rev. Ramankutty, later known as Pastor Paul, also worked with Cook for some time before starting off on his own path.

Early leaders that worked with Cook in building up the Church of God in its early days in Mulakuzha include Rev. T.M. Varghese and Rev. U. Thomas. When laws were passed that forbade foreign missionaries in India, it was T.M. Varghese that served as the Field Secretary. When the church had developed to the point that it was granted its own leadership, Rev. U. Thomas served as the first Overseer.

The Church was divided into three districts. These included Kerala State, Tamil Nadu and Central Region. Kerala State was later divided into two at the request of the brothers of low caste backgrounds. The new region was named Kerala Division and is now named Kerala Region, with headquarters in Kottayam. The region of Andhra Pradesh was included. The work that was started and run by Rev. Samuel John was incorporated into the Church as the Northern Region. In the 1990s, under the leadership of Rev. K M Thankachan, the Central Region was divided into two regions with Mumbai as the headquarters of the Western Region and Kolkata as the headquarters of the Eastern Region. There are many departments now under the Church. They provide and undertake many activities for the believers

As the work spread, there were many future leaders that joined hands with him. Among them were K.E. Abraham, M. M. John, N. J. Stephen and P. D. Chacko and Paul Ramunkutty, the founder of The Pentecostal Mission. However, as time went by, there arose disagreements over doctrine and organizational structure. Though Cook came as an independent missionary, he later joined the Church of God (Cleveland, Tennessee). This, and other reasons, caused rifts between Cook and many of his workers.

Wishing to remain under native Indian missionary organization, K. E. Abraham left with many of the Syrian Christians and founded the Indian Pentecostal Church of God. As a result, Cook relocated to Mulakuzha, Alleppey. He built the Bungalow on land that was partly donated and partly bought. The Bible Training Center was relocated to the Bungalow, also. Though most of the people that remained with him were converts from lower castes, the work continued to grow at a very fast rate among both these castes as well as among the Syrian Christians. Later he moved to Tirunelveli in Tamil Nadu and continued his mission there. By the time he returned to the U.S., the work had spread to the neighboring states and had been registered in Tamil Nadu with the Central Government under the Indian Societies Act.

As the work in India continued to grow, the leadership of the Church of God began to take more interest and send more support and workers. Cook, due to age and to challenges to his authority from both local workers and from the missionaries sent by Cleveland, turned over the work fully to Church of God control and returned to the U.S. His wife, daughter, Blossom, and sons, George and Robert, returned with him. Though the others have died, his sons still reside in the United States and are involved in their own ministries.

In October 2013, the Robert F. Cook International Conference (RFCIC) was held at the Church of God Kerala State Headquarters at Mt. Zion, Mulkuzha, Chengannur, Kerala, India celebrating the 100th anniversary of his arrival in India

References

Sources
37 Years of Glorious Service Robert F. Cook. Cleveland: Church of God Publishing, 1975.

Protestant missionaries in India
American Pentecostal missionaries
American expatriates in India
1880 births
1958 deaths